Gilbert Emery Bensley Pottle (June 11, 1875 – October 28, 1945), known professionally as Gilbert Emery, was an American actor who appeared in over 80 movies from 1921 to his death in 1945. He was also a playwright, author of seven Broadway plays from 1921 to 1933.

Early years 
Gilbert Emery Bensley Pottle was born June 11, 1875, in Naples, New York, to William L. and Hariette (Gilbert) Pottle. He prepared for college at Naples High School and at the Normal School in Oneonta, New York. He graduated from Amherst College in the class of 1899.

Career 
Pottle started out as a short story writer, using the name Emery Pottle, and he later wrote plays. From 1899 to 1900 he was an instructor in English and public speaking at Beloit Academy in Wisconsin. In 1900 he was a reporter for the Morning Sun in New York City; from 1900-1901 he worked for the Evening Post; and from 1901-1903 he worked for Criterion Magazine. He was an instructor in English at Columbia University and a writer.

During World War I, Pottle was a member of the American Expeditionary Forces' Liaison Service, serving with French Balloon Companies 39, 49 and 74. He was later a member of the Paris Peace Conference from 1918 to 1919, and a member of the Interallied Food Commission in 1919.

He wrote a number of books in his early years, including Handicapped, The Little Village, and The Little House. He also wrote poems and short stories for magazines and several plays. Much of his writing was under the pen name Gilbert Emery.

Personal life
On November 22, 1904, Emery (using the name Emery Pottle) married Juliet Wilbour Tompkins, a writer, in New York. Tompkins sued for divorce in March 1905.

Death
He died on October 28, 1945, in Los Angeles, California.

Filmography
From 1921 until his death in 1945, Gilbert Emery acted in at least 88 films, including:

References

External links 

 
 
 
 Wounded Soldier at Montauville, a poem written by Emery during World War I

1875 births
1945 deaths
American male film actors
American male silent film actors
Amherst College alumni
20th-century American male actors
People from Naples, New York
American dramatists and playwrights